The Greater London Authority (GLA), colloquially known by the metonym "City Hall", is the devolved regional governance body of Greater London. It consists of two political branches: the executive Mayoralty (currently led by Sadiq Khan) and the 25-member London Assembly, which serves as a means of checks and balances on the former. Since May 2016, both branches have been under the control of the London Labour Party. The authority was established in 2000, following a local referendum, and derives most of its powers from the Greater London Authority Act 1999 and the Greater London Authority Act 2007.

It is a strategic regional authority, with powers over transport, policing, economic development, and fire and emergency planning. Three functional bodies—Transport for London, the Mayor's Office for Policing and Crime, and the London Fire Commissioner—are responsible for delivery of services in these areas. The planning policies of the Mayor of London are detailed in a statutory London Plan that is regularly updated and published.

The Greater London Authority is mostly funded by direct government grant and it is also a precepting authority, with some money collected with local Council Tax. The GLA is unique in the British devolved and local government system, in terms of structure (it uses a presidential system-esque model), elections and selection of powers. The authority was established to replace a range of joint boards and quangos and provided an elected upper tier of local government in Greater London for the first time since the abolition of the Greater London Council in 1986.

Purpose
The GLA is responsible for the strategic administration of the 1579 km2 (610 sq. miles) of Greater London. It shares local government powers with the councils of 32 London boroughs and the City of London Corporation. It was created to improve the co-ordination between the local authorities in Greater London, and the Mayor of London's role is to give London a single person to represent it. The Mayor proposes policy and the GLA's budget, and makes appointments to the capital's strategic executive such as Transport for London. The primary purpose of the London Assembly is to hold the Mayor of London to account by scrutiny of his or her actions and decisions. The assembly must also accept or amend the mayor's budget on an annual basis. The GLA is based at City Hall in the London Borough of Newham, situated next to the redeveloped Royal Victoria Dock in Canning Town. The GLA moved to this building from the previous City Hall, in Southwark, in January 2022. 

The GLA is different from the corporation of the City of London with its largely ceremonial lord mayors, which controls only the square mile of the city, London's chief financial centre.

Background

In 1986, the Greater London Council was abolished by the Conservative government of Margaret Thatcher. Many people have surmised that the decision to abolish the GLC was made because of the existence of a high-spending left-wing Labour administration under Ken Livingstone, although pressure for the abolition of the GLC had arisen before Livingstone took over, and was largely driven by the belief among the outer London borough councils that they could perform the functions of the GLC just as well.

On abolition, the strategic functions of the GLC were transferred to bodies controlled by central government or joint boards nominated by the London borough councils. Some of the service delivery functions were transferred down to the councils themselves. For the next 14 years there was no single elected body for the whole of London. The Labour Party never supported the abolition of the GLC and made it a policy to re-establish some form of citywide elected authority.

Creation
The Labour party adopted a policy of a single, directly elected mayor (a policy first suggested by Tony Banks in 1990), together with an elected assembly watching over the mayor; this model, based on the mayor–council government of many American cities, was partly aimed at making sure the new body resembled the erstwhile GLC as little as possible. After the Labour party won the 1997 general election, the policy was outlined in a white paper entitled A Mayor and Assembly for London (March 1998).

Simultaneously with the elections to the London Borough councils, a referendum was held on the establishment of the GLA in May 1998, which was approved with 72% of the vote. The Greater London Authority Act 1999 passed through Parliament, receiving royal assent in October 1999. In a controversial election campaign, the then prime minister, Tony Blair, attempted to block Livingstone's nomination and imposed his own candidate. In reaction, Livingstone stood as an independent candidate, resulting in his expulsion from the Labour Party and in March 2000, was elected as Mayor of London. Following an interim period in which the mayor and assembly had been elected but had no powers, the GLA was formally established on 3 July 2000.

Headquarters

For the first two years of its existence, the Greater London Authority was based at Romney House, 47 Marsham Street in Westminster. Meetings of the London Assembly took place at Emmanuel Centre, also on Marsham Street.

Between July 2002 and December 2021, the Greater London Authority was based at a building known as City Hall in Southwark, on the banks of the River Thames, close to Tower Bridge. City Hall was designed by Norman Foster and constructed at a cost of £43 million on a site formerly occupied by wharves serving the Pool of London. This building did not belong to the GLA but was leased under a 25-year rental agreement from the Kuwait Investment Authority.

In November 2020, Mayor of London Sadiq Khan announced plans to vacate City Hall at the end of 2021 and relocate to The Crystal in the Canning Town area of East London. The Crystal building is owned by the Greater London Authority and is currently under-occupied. City Hall was not owned by the authority itself and the proposed move would save the Greater London Authority £12.6 million a year in rental costs. The decision was confirmed on 3 November 2020. Newham Borough Council gave permission for a change of use for the building in December 2020. The authority vacated City Hall on 2 December 2021 and the move is due to completed in the first week of January 2022. The Crystal was renamed "City Hall" in December 2021.

In addition to City Hall, staff of the Greater London Authority are also based at Palestra House on Blackfriars Road and at the London Fire Brigade headquarters on Union Street, both in Southwark.

The predecessors of the Greater London Authority, the Greater London Council and the London County Council, had their headquarters at County Hall, upstream on the South Bank. Although County Hall's old council chamber is still intact, the building is unavailable for use by the GLA because of its conversion into, among other things, a luxury hotel, amusement arcade and aquarium.

Powers and functions

Functional bodies
Areas which the GLA has responsibility for include transport, policing, fire and rescue, development and strategic planning. The GLA does not directly provide any services itself. Instead, its work is carried out by functional bodies which come under the GLA umbrella and work under the policy direction of the mayor and assembly. These functional bodies (defined in section 424 (1) of the Greater London Authority Act 1999)are:
Transport for London (TfL) – Responsible for managing most aspects of London's transport system, including public transport, main roads, and traffic management, and administering the London congestion charge.
Mayor's Office for Policing and Crime – Responsible for overseeing the Metropolitan Police Service, which provides policing throughout Greater London. Replaced the Metropolitan Police Authority in January 2012 under the provisions of the Police Reform and Social Responsibility Act 2011.
The London Fire Commissioner – Administers the London Fire Brigade and co-ordinates emergency planning.  Until April 2017 this was the responsibility of the London Fire and Emergency Planning Authority (LFEPA).
 The London Legacy Development Corporation and Old Oak and Park Royal Development Corporation, which are Mayoral development corporations. Before April 2012 the London Development Agency (LDA) was responsible for development across London but was wound up following the Localism Act 2011. The London Legacy Development Corporation and Old Oak and Park Royal Development Corporation were set up using powers in the Localism Act to create Mayoral development corporations.

In November 2005, the government published a consultation document reviewing the powers of the GLA, making proposals for additional powers, including waste management, planning, housing, and learning and skills. The result of the consultation and final proposals were published by the Department for Communities and Local Government on 13 July 2006.

Planning
The GLA is responsible for co-ordinating land use planning in Greater London. The mayor produces a strategic plan, the "London Plan". The individual London Borough councils are legally bound to comply with the plan. The mayor has the power to over-ride planning decisions made by the London Boroughs if they are believed to be against the interests of London as a whole.

Energy policy
As of 2006, London generates 42 million tonnes of carbon emissions per year, 7% of the UK's total. 44% of this comes from housing, 28% from commercial premises, 21% from transport, and 7% from industry.

The Mayor's energy strategy planned to cut carbon emission levels by 20% by 2010 and 60% by 2050 (although achieving the first of these targets is unlikely). Measures taken to achieve this have included the creation of the London Climate Change Agency, the London Energy Partnership and the founding of the international Large Cities Climate Leadership Group.

The London Sustainable Development Commission has calculated that for housing to meet the 60% target, all new developments would have to be constructed to be carbon-neutral with immediate effect (using zero energy building techniques), in addition to cutting energy used in existing housing by 40%.

Political control
After the 2021 elections, Labour has the largest representation on the GLA with the mayor as well as eleven assembly members, followed by nine from the Conservatives, three Greens, and two from the Liberal Democrats.

Elections
2000 London Assembly election
2000 London mayoral election
2004 London Assembly election
2004 London mayoral election
2008 London Assembly election
2008 London mayoral election
2012 London Assembly election
2012 London mayoral election
2016 London Assembly election
2016 London mayoral election
2021 London Assembly election
2021 London mayoral election

See also
History of local government in London
Scotland Yard
Lord Mayor of the City of London
City of London Corporation
London boroughs
Foreign relations of the Mayor of London
Boundary map

References

External links
 
 About the GLA – Website detailing the powers of the GLA
 House of Commons Library Briefing Note, June 2018
 Greater London Authority Review, 2005–06 – House of Commons Library Standard Note
 Wikisource – Referendum Results

 
Local authorities in London
Government agencies established in 2000
2000 establishments in England
2000 in London
Major precepting authorities in England